Armstrong Creek is a rural locality in the Moreton Bay Region, Queensland, Australia.

Geography
The North Pine River marks a portion of the northeastern boundary.

D'Aguilar National Park protects a section of forest in the west, where the D'Aguilar Range rises to elevations greater than 500 m.

History
Armstrong Creek Provisional School opened circa February 1900. On 1 January 1909, it became Armstrong Creek State School. It closed on 30 March 1919. The school building was relocated to establish the school in Ocean View. 

References

Suburbs of Moreton Bay Region
Localities in Queensland